The southern blind snake (Rena unguirostris) is a species of snake in the family Leptotyphlopidae. The species is endemic to South America.

Geographic range
R. unguirostris is found in Argentina, Bolivia, and Paraguay.

Reproduction
R. unguirostris is oviparous.

References

Further reading
Adalsteinsson SA, Branch WR, Trape S, Vitt LJ, Hedges SB (2009). "Molecular phylogeny, classification, and biogeography of snakes of the family Leptotyphlopidae (Reptilia, Squamata)" Zootaxa 2244: 1-50. (Rena unguirostris, new combination).
Boulenger GA (1902). "List of the Fishes, Batrachians, and Reptiles collected by the late Mr. P. O. Simons in the Provinces of Mendoza and Cordova, Argentina". Ann. Mag. Nat. Hist., Seventh Series 9 (53): 336–339. (Glauconia unguirostris, new species, p. 338).
Cacciali, Pier; Scott, Norman J.; Aquino Ortíz, Aida Luz; Fitzgerald, Lee A.; Smith, Paul (2016). The Reptiles of Paraguay: Literature, Distribution, and an Annotated Taxonomic Checklist. Albuquerque, New Mexico: The Museum of Southwestern Biology, University of New Mexico. 373 pp. (Rena unguirostris, p. 291).

Rena (genus)
Reptiles described in 1902